Broughton and Milton Keynes Parish Council is a joint parish council for Milton Keynes and Broughton civil parishes in the City of Milton Keynes UA, Buckinghamshire, England. The combined parish is one of a number within Milton Keynes, the overall settlement that takes its name from the village at the heart of its parish.

The parish council serves the combined area of Broughton CP (which covers Atterbury, Brooklands, Brook Furlong, Broughton and Northfield) and Milton Keynes CP (which covers Fox Milne, Middleton (including Milton Keynes Village), Oakgrove and Pineham).

According to the 2011 census the two parishes have a combined population of 8,117.

References

External links
Broughton and Milton Keynes Parish Council

Parish councils of England
Local authorities in Buckinghamshire
Local precepting authorities in England
Milton Keynes